Meymac Abbey is a 13th-century Benedictine abbey located in Meymac, France.

The original monastery on the site was founded in the 10th century by Vicomte de Comborn. Construction of the abbey started in the 12th century but was not entirely completed until the 13th century.

The building was listed for heritage protection in 1840.

See also
List of Benedictine monasteries in France

References

External links

Vacances en Correze - L’ancienne Abbatiale St-André et St-Léger (Abbey Church).
Meymac: The Black Virgin of Meymac, The Egyptian

Benedictine monasteries in France
Order of Saint Benedict
Buildings and structures in Corrèze